is a Japanese actress and former idol singer. She was in the girl groups Momoiro Clover Z and Nogizaka46.

Career 
As a child, Kashiwa acted in many tokusatsu dramas, including Tokusō Sentai Dekaranger, Garo, and Madan Senki Ryukendo. In 2007, at the age of 13, she played the role of Negi Springfield, the title character of Negima! Magister Negi Magi, in a 25-episode live-action TV series based on the manga and anime of the same name.

Along with Ayaka Sasaki and Akari Hayami, Kashiwa joined Stardust Promotion's girl group Momoiro Clover, now known as Momoiro Clover Z, on November 23, 2008. Simultaneously, the group announced their debut single, titled "Momoiro Punch". However, Kashiwa left the group on March 9 of the following year, before the single was released.

On August 21, 2011, Kashiwa passed the audition to become a first generation member of the idol girl group Nogizaka46. On November 12, 2013, the Nogizaka46 website announced that Kashiwa would be graduating from the group in order to concentrate on her studies. On November 17, at a promotional event for the group's single "Girls' Rule", Kashiwa and fellow first generation member Seira Miyazawa graduated from Nogizaka46.

In 2015, Kashiwa returned to the entertainment industry, modeling for the magazine CanCam and pursuing work as an actress.

Filmography

Films

TV series

References

External links 
 

Momoiro Clover Z members
Nogizaka46 members
1994 births
Living people
Japanese idols
Japanese child actresses
Japanese women pop singers
Actresses from Kanagawa Prefecture
Former Stardust Promotion artists
Musicians from Kanagawa Prefecture